Metabotropic glutamate receptor 3 (mGluR3) is an inhibitory Gi/G0-coupled G-protein coupled receptor (GPCR) generally localized to presynaptic sites of neurons in classical circuits. However, in higher cortical circuits in primates, mGluR3 are localized post-synaptically, where they strengthen rather than weaken synaptic connectivity. In humans, mGluR3 is encoded by the GRM3 gene. Deficits in mGluR3 signaling have been linked to impaired cognition in humans, and to increased risk of schizophrenia,  consistent with their expanding role in cortical evolution.

Structure 

In humans, mGluR3 is encoded by the GRM3 gene on chromosome 7. At least five protein-coding isoforms are predicted based on genomic information. The mGluR3 protein is a seven-pass transmembrane protein.

Function 

L-glutamate is the major excitatory neurotransmitter in the central nervous system and activates both ionotropic and metabotropic glutamate receptors. Glutamatergic neurotransmission is involved in most aspects of normal brain function and can be perturbed in many neuropathologic conditions. The metabotropic glutamate receptors are a family of G protein-coupled receptors, that have been divided into 3 groups on the basis of sequence homology, putative signal transduction mechanisms, and pharmacologic properties. Group I includes GRM1 and GRM5 and these receptors have been shown to activate phospholipase C. Group II includes GRM2 and GRM3 while Group III includes GRM4, GRM6, GRM7 and GRM8. Group II and III receptors are linked to the inhibition of the cyclic AMP cascade but differ in their agonist selectivities.

Clinical significance 

The mGluR3 receptor encoded by the GRM3 gene has been found to be associated with a range of psychiatric disorders, including bipolar affective disorder as well as schizophrenia.

A mutation in the Kozak sequence in the 1st exon of the GRM3 gene was shown to change translation and transcription of cloned GRM3 gene constructs and was significantly associated with bipolar disorder with an odds ratio of 4.4. Subsequently, a marker in GRM3 was implicated in a large genome-wide association study of schizophrenia with statistical significance of p<10−9. A follow-up study of the Kozak sequence variant showed that it was associated with increased risk of bipolar disorder, schizophrenia and alcoholism. The mGluR3 receptor encoded by GRM3 is targetable by several drugs that have been used in previous trials of schizophrenia and anxiety disorder. The agonist, antagonist and allosteric modulator drugs of mGluR3 can now be explored as new treatments for mental illness. Other scientific evidence has been published which shows that the well established anti-manic drug lithium carbonate also changes GRM3 gene expression in the mouse brain after treatment with lithium carbonate.

Ligands
mGluR3 modulators that are significantly selective over the isoform mGluR2 are known since 2013.

Agonists

with a bicyclo[3.1.0]hexane skeleton
MGS-0028
LY404040
LY379268
LY354740; its (+)-C4α-methyl analog is a GluR2 agonist / GluR3 antagonist
LY-2794193
(R)-2-amino-4-(4-hydroxy[1,2,5]thiadiazol-3-yl)butyric acid

Antagonists

CECXG – 38x selectivity for mGlu3 over mGlu2
LY-341,495 and its 1-fluoro analog: potent orthosteric antagonists
MGS-0039, HYDIA (both with bicyclo[3.1.0]hexane skeleton)

Allosteric modulators
D3-ML337: selective NAM, IC50 = 450 nM for mGluR3, IC50 >30μM for mGluR2
MNI-137: inhibitor
 VU-0650786: NAM
compound 7p: non-competitive antagonist (presumably allosteric inhibitor)
 LY 2389575: negative allosteric modulator.

Interactions 

Metabotropic glutamate receptor 3 has been shown to interact with:
 GRIP1, 
 PICK1, and 
 PPM1A.

See also 
 Metabotropic glutamate receptor

References

Further reading

External links 
 

Metabotropic glutamate receptors